Calibre Sports Inc. is one of Melbourne, Australia's most successful pistol clubs. With a history spanning more than 20 years and operating under several different names, Calibre Sports is now based in Broadford, Victoria on part of the Victorian State Motorcycle Complex.

About
Calibre Sports Incorporated was founded in 1994. Now based at our range in Broadford, Victoria, It is organised as a Member-directed club, structured by a constitution.

The club is affiliated with the worldwide shooting organisations IPSC and ICORE. It is also affiliated with the Victoria-based VAPA. In addition to in-house competitions, the club provides a successful stream of competitors in disciplines specified by the aforementioned organisations. Calibre Sports members regularly participate in National and International shooting events.

In the beginning
Calibre Sports had its beginnings at the Victoria Ranges Indoor Rock Climbing Centre in Mt. Alexander Rd, Flemington.

Back then in 1994, the club was known as Victoria Ranges Pistol Club. Membership fees were minimal and paid directly to the Victoria Ranges Complex and did not include lane hire.

Whilst there was a committee, the club was run as part of the "Victoria Ranges" business and any final decisions were always made by the owners there.

Victoria Ranges pistol club boasted a membership of over 800, but as is normally the case only a small percentage were actually active competitively.

A small group of members worked in conjunction with Victoria Ranges and held weekly competitions.

At the end of each term prizes were awarded to the top shooters and these were usually handguns for 1st, 2nd and 3rd place.

Flemington Indoor Pistol Club
As more members became interested in the day-to-day running of the club, they realised that the club needed to stand on its own if it was to continue successfully.

And so, in 1995 "Flemington Indoor Pistol Club" (FIPC) was formed. Now an Incorporated Association the club had its own identity, separate from any business or shooting body.

However, it was difficult for the club to function independently as it was still under the administration of "Victoria Ranges" and as such unable to collect or have access to any club funds.

It wasn't until 198, when members decided that they wanted the club to be run as a club that the first AGM was held and as a result, the club was to be managed solely by a member elected committee.

Independence
The club came to an agreement with Victoria Ranges. FIPC would lease a small office upstairs, members would renew via the club and pay a separate fee for a lane hire package directly to Victoria Ranges.

A turbulent 12 months followed with several clashes between committee members and Victoria Ranges staff. It was becoming evident that Victoria Ranges wanted to regain control of the club.

in 1999 a group headed by some FIPC committee members together with Victoria Ranges management formed "Melbourne Indoor Pistol Club" (MIPC).

MIPC was also based at the Victoria Ranges Centre and this created great confusion for FIPC members as MIPC's logo was a direct copy of the FIPC logo with only the name changed, even the renewal forms were the same.

As a result, many members paid their renewal fees via the Victoria Ranges staff, they were not informed that this fee was not going to their club and that the staff were signing them up to MIPC.

This was to have a devastating effect on club membership and many members had no idea what was going on or which club they actually belonged to.

Time for a change
It was clear that something needed to be done and in late 1999 FIPC opted for a name change, a competition was conducted to select the new name and logo. Many entries were received of which Calibre Sports was the most popular and so "Calibre Sports Inc" was formed.

Whilst Calibre Sports was easily distinguishable, attracting new members was difficult and membership was slowly dropping.

In mid 2000 Ivan Rehlicki of Relic Custom, approached Calibre Sports with a proposal for the club to relocate to a new Indoor Range under construction in Thomastown. Calibre Sports would be the primary club and any new members would be signed up by Calibre Sports. The proposal was put to the membership in September 2000 and they voted in favour of the move.

The Relic Custom Indoor Shooting Complex opened in early 2002. Approximately 200 members made the move to Thomastown.

Over the next 2 years membership increased to over 500, making Calibre Sports one of the largest pistol clubs in Australia. The club affiliated with IPSC and ICORE and together with Relic Custom implemented a significant sponsorship program which helped to promote both entities.

In 2003 handgun owners were hit hard by the government buyback, a result of the Monash shootings.

The National Handgun Buyback Act 2003 was signed into law on 30 June 2003. New restrictions were put in place on maximum calibre and number of shots for handguns and minimum barrel lengths for handguns.

Victoria began its handgun buyback scheme in August 2003. This impacted severely on both the club and the range.

Whilst owners were compensated for their surrendered handguns, many chose not to remain in the sport and as a result of a lengthy period of uncertainty dealers sold very few guns over the following month with many forced to close their doors.

Calibre Sports lost a significant number of members during this time. Changes to the laws made handgun ownership more complex and competitions were made compulsory.

Those dealers that remained had the option of filing a claim for compensation and Relic Custom exercised that option. It was a long drawn out process which finally saw a conclusion on 16 October 2007 when the Victorian government settled the claim by Relic Custom and advised that the range would close two weeks late on 30 October.

A club in limbo 
After the closure of the Relic Custom complex in Thomastown the club was without a home range for several years. With thanks to the generous support of the Oakleigh Pistol Club, Calibre Sports was able to continue running a monthly competition for its members, therefore allowing it to survive as a club.

All forms of venues were investigated as a possible new home range for the club until an advertisement was placed in the local paper of the Mitchell Shire seeking expressions of interest for the lease of land to build an outdoor range.

A new future for the club. 
There were a number of responses to the advertisement and a lot of inspections were conducted by the committee. Finally a suitable site was found and after a lengthy process of lease negotiations with Motorcycle Victoria an agreement was reached subject to getting approval from Victoria Police.

After further delays for planning applications with the Mitchell Shire Council, work finally began on creating a pistol range and in December 2014 Calibre Sports hosted its first club match at its new home range in Broadford.

The club has continued to make improvements to the range over the years. In 2017 there was the addition of dividing walls on the top and bottom ranges increasing the amount of stages that could be run simultaneously.

The increase in stages also increased attendances at the monthly club competitions and necessitated improvements and expansion of the car park. New club rooms were built in mid 2020 as well as shade structures on all the ranges.

Calibre Sports's Broadford range is now one of the best ranges in the state and is capable of hosting state and national level matches in various disciplines.

See also
 Shooting sports

External links
 
 

Organisations based in Melbourne
Handgun shooting sports